A fixed orbit is the concept, in atomic physics, where an electron is considered to remain in a specific orbit, at a fixed distance from an atom's nucleus, for a particular energy level.
The concept was promoted by quantum physicist Niels Bohr c. 1913.
The idea of the fixed orbit is considered a major component of the Bohr model (or Bohr theory).

References 

Quantum mechanics
Niels Bohr